The following lists events that happened during 1962 in Australia.

Incumbents

Monarch – Elizabeth II
Prime Minister –  Robert Menzies
Governor General – William Sidney, 1st Viscount De L'Isle
Chief Justice – Sir Owen Dixon

State Premiers
Premier of New South Wales – Robert Heffron
Premier of Queensland – Frank Nicklin
Premier of South Australia – Sir Thomas Playford
Premier of Tasmania – Eric Reece
Premier of Western Australia – David Brand
Premier of Victoria – Henry Bolte

State Governors
Governor of New South Wales – Sir Eric Woodward
Governor of Queensland – Sir Henry Abel Smith
Governor of South Australia – Sir Edric Bastyan
Governor of Tasmania – Thomas Corbett, 2nd Baron Rowallan
Governor of Western Australia – Sir Charles Gairdner
Governor of Victoria – Sir Dallas Brooksis

Events
 The Australian Ballet is founded.
 1 March – The final section of the Cahill Expressway opens in Sydney.

 16 July – The Goulburn School Strike started. This was a education strike in Goulburn, New South Wales, where, in response to a demand for the installation of three extra toilets at a local Catholic Primary School, the local community closed down these schools and sent the children to the Government schools. The Catholic Church declared they had no money to install the extra toilets. Nearly 1,000 children turned up to be enrolled locally and the state schools were unable to accommodate them. In 1963, Menzies made State aid for science blocks part of his party's platform in response to the public debate engendered by the Goulburn strike.
 15 August – The Red Sales aerobatic team, flying Vampire jets, crashes in practice, killing six people.
 28 September – Paddington tram depot fire: One fifth of the Brisbane tram fleet is destroyed when the Paddington tram depot is burnt down in suspicious circumstances. 65 trams are destroyed.

Arts and literature

 2 November – The first performance of the Australian Ballet Company in Sydney was of Swan Lake.
 The Well Dressed Explorer by Thea Astley and The Cupboard Under the Stairs by George Turner are jointly awarded the Miles Franklin Literary Award

Television
 4 March – NBN Television opens in Newcastle, New South Wales as NBN-3.
 18 March – WIN Television opens in Wollongong, New South Wales as WIN-4.
 26 May - Southern Cross Television opens in Launceston, Tasmania as TNT-9

Sport
 General
 Australia wins 38 gold medals at the 1962 British Empire and Commonwealth Games, held in Perth
 Athletics
 11 August – Keith Ollerenshaw wins the men's national marathon title, clocking 2:26:24.2 in Perth.
 Cricket
 New South Wales wins the Sheffield Shield
 Football
 Bledisloe Cup: retained by the All Blacks
 Brisbane Rugby League premiership: Norths defeated Valleys 22–0
 New South Wales Rugby League premiership: St. George defeated Wests 9–6 ** South Australian National Football League premiership: won by Port Adelaide
 Victorian Football League premiership: Essendon defeated Carlton 90–58 * Golf
 Australian Open: won by Gary Player
 Australian PGA Championship: won by Bill Dunk
 Horse Racing
 Indian Summer wins the AJC Oaks
 Even Stevens wins the Caulfield Cup
 Aquanita wins the Cox Plate
 Birthday Card wins the Golden Slipper
 Even Stevens wins the Melbourne Cup
 Motor Racing
 The Australian Grand Prix was held at Caversham and won by Bruce McLaren driving a Cooper-Climax
 The Armstrong 500 was held at Phillip Island, and was won by Harry Firth and Bob Jane driving an XL Falcon
 Squash
 Heather Blundell wins the Women's Championship at the British Open Squash Championships
 Tennis
 Australian Open men's singles: Rod Laver defeats Roy Emerson 8–6 0–6 6–4 6-4
 Australian Open women's singles: Margaret Court defeats Jan Lehane O'Neill 6–0 6-2
 Davis Cup: Australia defeats Mexico 5–0 in the 1962 Davis Cup final
 French Open: Rod Laver wins the Men's Singles
 French Open: Margaret Court wins the Women's Singles
 French Open: Roy Emerson and Neale Fraser win the Men's Doubles
 US Open: Rod Laver wins the Men's Singles
 US Open: Margaret Court wins the Women's Singles
 Wimbledon: Rod Laver wins the Men's Singles
 Wimbledon: Bob Hewitt and Fred Stolle win the Men's Doubles
 Yachting
 Gretel makes Australias first challenge for the America's Cup, losing 4–1 to the American opponent Weatherly
 Ondine takes line honours and Solo wins on handicap in the Sydney to Hobart Yacht Race

Births
 23 January – Richard Roxburgh, actor, writer, producer and director
 28 January – Barbara Stone, politician
 14 February – Stephen Robertson, politician
 17 February – David McComb, musician (d. 1999)
 22 February – Steve Irwin, wildlife expert and media personality (died 2006)
 9 March – Jeff Knuth, politician
 13 April – Andrew Jachno, race walker
 24 April – Steve "Blocker" Roach, rugby league footballer of the 1980s and 1990s
 26 April – Trevor Marmalade, comedian and author
 6 May – Julieanne Gilbert, politician
 13 May – Paul McDermott, comedian and singer
 25 May – Ros Bates, politician
 28 May – Gary Belcher, rugby league player and commentator
 24 June – Steve Dickson, politician
 9 July – Paul Lucas, politician
 15 July – Michelle Ford, swimmer
 18 July – Shaun Micallef, comedian
 31 July – Damien Frawley, rugby union player
 6 August – Steven Lee, alpine skier
 7 September – Kylie InGold, fantasy artist
 15 September – Scott McNeil, voice actor
 17 September – Baz Luhrmann, film director and producer
 26 September – Steve Moneghetti, long distance runner
 13 October – David Dalgleish, politician
 26 October – Rob Messenger, politician
 30 October – Colin Boyce, politician
 10 November – Bob Lindner, rugby league footballer and coach
 11 November – James Morrison, jazz musician
 5 December – Michael Harvey, racewalker
 8 December
 Steve Elkington, golfer
 Tracy Davis, politician
 12 December – Chris Cummins, politician
 16 December – John English, politician

Deaths
 17 January – Frank Hurley, film maker and photographer (b. 1885)
 3 December – Dame Mary Gilmore, socialist poet and journalist (b. 1865)

See also
 List of Australian films of the 1960s

References

 
Australia
Years of the 20th century in Australia